Archibald Ronald Bevis (born 10 April 1955) is an Australian Labor Party politician who served as the Member for Brisbane from 1990 to 2010. Bevis held a variety of ministerial, shadow ministerial, and parliamentary leadership positions including Parliamentary Secretary for Defence, Shadow Minister for Homeland Security, the Chair of the Parliamentary Joint Committee on Intelligence and Security, and Chair of the Defence Subcommittee of the Joint Standing Committee on Foreign Affairs, Defence and Trade.

Since leaving parliament, Bevis has served as a Member of the Defence Remuneration Tribunal, the Board of Directors of Defence Housing Australia, and the ANZAC Centenary Advisory Board.

Early life and education
He was born in Brisbane, and educated at Ithaca Creek State School and The Gap State High School, and graduated as a teacher from the then Brisbane CAE (now QUT). Whilst studying to become a teacher Bevis was president of the Australian Student Teachers Federation.

Pre-parliamentary career
Bevis worked as a teacher between 1975 and 1977. He became the Queensland President of Young Labor in 1975, aged 20, and went on to become National President of Young Labor in 1978, aged 23.

Between 1978 and 1980, Bevis worked as an organiser for the Queensland Teachers Union. In 1980, aged 25, he was promoted to Deputy General Secretary, a position he held until 1990.

From 1988–90, he was also a member of the Labor Party's national executive. He was elected Vice-President of the Australian Labor Party from 2000–02.

Parliamentary career

After being elected to the House of Representatives at the 1990 election, Bevis served on a number of committees. He chaired the Standing Committee on Industry, Science and Technology from 1992–93 and the Joint Standing Committee on Electoral Matters from 1992–94. From 1994 to 1996, he was also the Parliamentary Secretary to the Minister of Defence.

After Labor lost the 1996 election, Bevis was one of only two Queensland Labor members left in Federal Parliament and held the most northern Labor seat in Federal Parliament.

He was defeated at the 2010 Federal Election by Liberal National challenger Teresa Gambaro, formerly the member for Petrie, by only 1,831 votes (a difference of 916 votes).

Ministry
Bevis served as the Parliamentary Secretary to the Minister for Defence from the 25 March 1994 to 11 March 1996.

Shadow Ministry
He was promoted to the Shadow Cabinet in 1996 serving as Shadow Minister for Defence until 1998 and then as Shadow Minister for Industrial Relations from 1998 to 2001.

From 2004 to 2005 he served as the Shadow Minister for Defence Planning, Procurement and Personnel and Shadow Minister Assisting the Shadow Minister for Industrial Relations. From 2005 to 2007 he served as the Shadow Minister for Homeland Security and Territories responsible for justice, customs, aviation and transport security, and the territories of the Commonwealth.

Committee leadership
Following the 2007 federal election, Bevis was elected Chairperson of the Parliamentary Joint Committee on Intelligence and Security and Chairperson of the Joint Defence Sub-Committee of the Joint Standing Committee on Foreign Affairs, Defence and Trade.

Later life
He was also appointed to the Defence Remuneration Tribunal, the board of directors of Defence Housing Australia, and the ANZAC Centenary Advisory Board.

Awards
Bevis has been awarded life membership of the Australian Education Union (AEU), the Queensland Branch of the Australian Labor Party (ALP), and the Queensland Teachers Union (QTU). Arch also received a Medal of the Order of Australia (OAM).

References

External links
 Hon. Arch Bevis MP

1955 births
Living people
Australian Labor Party members of the Parliament of Australia
Labor Right politicians
Members of the Australian House of Representatives
Members of the Australian House of Representatives for Brisbane
21st-century Australian politicians
20th-century Australian politicians